TFD may stand for:

Computer games and films 
 The Final Destination, a 2009 3D horror/thriller film
 Army of Two: The 40th Day, a video game
 Command & Conquer: The First Decade, a compilation of Command & Conquer series computer games

Fire departments 
 Tokyo Fire Department, the fire and rescue service of Tokyo, Japan
 Timmins Fire Department, statutory fire department of Timmins, Ontario
 Toronto Fire Department, former name of Toronto Fire Services

Companies and organizations 
 The Film Department, a film production company in California
 The Forests Dialogue, an organization sponsored by Yale University School of Forestry and Environmental Studies
 Taiwan Foundation for Democracy, NGO based in Taiwan

Other uses 
 The Free Dictionary, an online dictionary
 "Two-Four-D", alternate name for 2,4-Dichlorophenoxyacetic acid (2,4-D), a herbicide
 Thermo Field Dynamics, a topic within thermal quantum field theory
 Thin-film diode, an active matrix backplane alternative to thin-film transistor technology
 Top Fuel dragster, a type of drag racing car
 Transcription factors database, an index of DNA transcription factors
 Toothpaste for dinner, a webcomic
 The Fully Down (1993-2008), a former Canadian band
 Total Foreign Debt, see external debt